Bagrat (1741–1800) was a Georgian royal prince (batonishvili) of the Bagrationi dynasty of Imereti. He was the common ancestor of all male-line descendants of the kings of Imereti, surviving into the 21st century.

Prince Bagrat was a younger of King Alexander V of Imereti by his wife, Tamar née Abashidze. He was, thus, a younger brother of King Solomon I of Imereti and an uncle of Solomon II, the last reigning monarch of Imereti. Prince Bagrat was married to Mariam (1741–1820), daughter of Prince Giorgi, Eristavi of Guria. He had two children:

Prince Simon (born 1771), a natural son, forefather of the noble (aznauri) family of Bagration, which is the only branch of the Imeretian Bagrationi still surviving in Georgia in a male line.
David (1781-1820), a son by Princess Mariam. He was the ancestor of the Princes Bagration, which became extinct in male line in 1937.

References

1741 births
1800 deaths
Georgian princes
Bagrationi dynasty of the Kingdom of Imereti